Abalistes filamentosus is a triggerfish of the genus Abalistes. It is found in the Indo-Pacific Ocean and in subtropical waters. It lives in the Pelagic-Neritic zone of the ocean between 61–180 meters deep. It is harmless to humans.

Distribution
Abalistes filamentosus is found in the marine and subtropical waters of the Indo-Pacific, especially in the range of the Ryukyu Islands to the North West Shelf of Australia, and the Timor Sea. It was also reported in New Caledonia.

Description

Abalistes filamentosus has a total of three dorsal spines, 25-27 dorsal soft rays, 22-25 anal soft rays, and 14-15 pectoral rays. The upper and lower rays of the caudal fin are formed from filaments. The spinal dorsal fin is dark brown, and the body has now yellow or light blue spots. The dark brown color gradually becomes white ventrally, and its cheek is brown with a tint of green. Its cross section is compressed and lateral lines are not interrupted.

Parasites
Abalistes filamentosus is a common host to ectoparasites, especially to copepods in the genus Hatschekia in the Ryukyu Island area.

References

Balistidae
Taxa named by Keiichi Matsuura
Taxa named by Tetsuo Yoshino
Fish described in 2004